Machines Are Us is the third feature-length album by Icon of Coil; it was released in 2004. "Android" was released prior to Machines Are Us, and an EP for "Shelter" was included in the limited edition version of Uploaded and Remixed.

Track listing
 Comment V.2.0 – 0:32
 Remove/Replace – 4:55
 Consumer – 6:07
 Shelter – 5:53
 Mono:Overload? – 4:57
 Existence in Progress – 5:22
 Faith:Not Important – 5:21
 Transfer:Complete – 5:38
 Dead Enough For Life – 5:05
 Wiretrip (Featuring Agnete Pedersen) – 3:27 
 Android – 5:26
 Sleep:Less – 6:29
 Pursuit – 4:42
 Release the Frequency / Afterwords – 8:59

CD2:
 Them And Us (Exclusive Lmtd Box Track) – 4:54
 Sleep:Less (8am Version) – 6:06
 Transfer:Complete (Delobbo Remix) – 7:25
 Transfer:Complete (Pitch Black Mix By D.r.i.v.E.) – 5:52
 Consumer (No Sign of JD on Mars Mix By Moonitor) – 6:21
 Wiretrip (Isle of Crows Remix) – 5:23

Android
 "Android" (Edit) – 4:27
 "Headhunter" (Front 242 Cover) – 6:10
 "Android" (Non Human Remix by Moonitor) – 7:08
 "Android" (Mix By Combichrist) – 4:17

Credits
All songs written, produced and recorded by Icon of Coil.

2004 albums
Icon of Coil albums